Blues Summit is the thirty-third studio album by B.B. King released in 1993 through the MCA label. The album reached peak positions of number 182 on the Billboard 200, and number 64 on Billboard R&B Albums chart. The album won a Grammy Award in 1994 for Best Traditional Blues Album.

It is the first of three duet albums in King's studio album discography. Unlike Deuces Wild and 80, all the guests come from the blues and R&B scene. The only song which is not a duet is the original "I Gotta Move Out Of This Neighborhood", which segues into "Nobody Loves Me But My Mother" (originally from Indianola Mississippi Seeds). All songs feature the B.B. King band of the era except for "Playin' With My Friends" (the only other new song on the album) and "You Shook Me", where the accompaniment comes from the Robert Cray Band, plus "Everybody's Had the Blues" featuring Joe Louis Walker's band.

A longer version of "Call It Stormy Monday" with the full ending and lacking the horn overdubs of the album version later appeared on the compilation album B.B. King: Anthology.

Credits and personnel

A1 - Playin' With My Friends - 5:17
Bass – Richard Cousins
Drums – Kevin Hayes
Guitar, Vocals – Robert Cray
Horns – The Memphis Horns
Keyboards – Jim Pugh
Rhythm Guitar – Robert Murray
Written-By – Dennis Walker, Robert Cray

A2 - Since I Met You Baby - 4:44
Piano, Vocals – Katie Webster
Rhythm Guitar – Vasti Jackson
Saxophone – Nancy Wright
Written-By – Ivory Joe Hunter

A3 - I Pity The Fool - 4:36
Guitar, Vocals – Buddy Guy
Harmonica – Kim Wilson
Rhythm Guitar – Mabon "Teenie" Hodges
Trumpet – Ben Cauley
Written-By – Deadric Malone

A4 - You Shook Me - 4:58
Bass – Richard Cousins
Drums – Kevin Hayes
Guitar – Robert Cray
Guitar, Vocals – John Lee Hooker
Harmonica – Kim Wilson
Keyboards – Jim Pugh
Percussion – Tony Coleman
Slide Guitar – Roy Rogers
Trumpet – Ben Cauley
Written-By – J. B. Lenoir, Willie Dixon

A5 - Something You Got - 4:02
Backing Vocals – Julia Tillman Waters, Maxayne Lewis, Maxine Waters
Baritone Saxophone – Walter King
Percussion – Antoine Salley
Rhythm Guitar – Robert Cray
Saxophone Solo – Lee Allen
Vocals – Koko Taylor
Written-By – Chris Kenner

A6 - There's Something On Your Mind - 5:59
Strings [Synthesizer] – Randy Waldman
Vocals – Etta James
Written-By – Cecil James McNeely

B1 - Little by Little - 4:07

Backing Vocals – Joe Louis Walker
Guitar, Vocals – Lowell Fulson
Written-By – Amos Blakemore

B2 - Call It Stormy Monday - 7:17

Guitar, Vocals – Albert Collins
Horns – The Memphis Horns
Written-By – Aaron T. Walker

B3 - You're The Boss - 4:05

Vocals – Ruth Brown
Written-By – Leiber & Stoller

B4 - We're Gonna Make It - 3:51

Backing Vocals – Julia Tillman Waters, Maxayne Lewis, Maxine Waters
Horns – The Memphis Horns
Rhythm Guitar – Mabon "Teenie" Hodges
Saxophone Solo – Lee Allen (musician)
Vocals – Irma Thomas
Written-By – Billy Davis, Carl Smith, Gene Barge, Raynard Miner

B5 - I Gotta Move Out Of This Neighborhood/Nobody Loves Me But My Mother - 8:57

Trumpet – Ben Cauley
Written-By – B.B. King

B6 - Everybody's Had The Blues - 4:35

Bass – Henry Oden
Drums – Paul Revelle
Guitar, Vocals – Joe Louis Walker
Horns – Jeff Lewis, Tim Devine 
Keyboards – Mike Eppley
Percussion – Tony Coleman
Written-By – Joe Louis Walker

Personnel

Vocals, Guitar – B.B. King (all tracks)
Bass – Michael Doster (except tracks 1, 4 and 12)
Drums – Calep Emphrey, Jr. (except tracks 1, 4 and 12)
Keyboards – James Toney (except tracks 1, 4 and 12)
Percussion – Tony Coleman (except tracks 1, 4 and 12)
Rhythm Guitar – Leon Warren (except tracks 1, 4 and 12)
Saxophone – Melvin Jackson, Walter King (except tracks 1, 4 and 12)
Trumpet – James Bolden (except tracks 1, 4 and 12)

Other credits

Musical Director & Horn arrangements – Walter King (except tracks 1 and 4)
Executive Producer – Sidney A. Seidenberg

References

1993 albums
B.B. King albums
Grammy Award for Best Traditional Blues Album
MCA Records albums